Corin Akl Jáuregui (born July 26, 1966) is a Venezuelan composer, pianist, and educator.

There she took music theory and solfeggio under Esther Calatrava, Carmen Defendini, and Rubén Alfonzo; she studied counterpoint, composition, and analysis with Juan Francisco Sans, and harmony with Violeta Lárez. At the  she studied music history and aesthetics under Walter Guido, taking lessons in chamber music with Marisela González and Jaime Martinez. She has taught music at the Escuela de Música Ars Nova and Escuela de Música Pablo Castellanos in her native city. Her output consists largely of chamber music, including numerous works for piano. She has also worked at the National Library of Venezuela during her career.

References

1966 births
Living people
Venezuelan classical composers
Venezuelan women classical composers
Venezuelan classical pianists
Women classical pianists
Musicians from Caracas
20th-century classical composers
20th-century classical pianists
Venezuelan music educators
21st-century classical pianists
Women music educators
20th-century women composers
20th-century women pianists
21st-century women pianists